Jab We Wed is a Pakistani romantic, comedy drama serial directed by Wajahat Rauf and written by Mohsin Ali. The drama stars Danish Taimoor and Ayeza Khan in lead roles. The drama was first aired Eid al-Fitr 2014 on Urdu 1.

Jab We Wed is also being aired on Indian channel Zindagi from 18 December 2015 every Monday to Saturday 8:30pm (IST) under the same title.

Plot outline 
Faris’ (Danish Taimoor) mother (Bushra Ansari) tells him that her dying wish is that he marry one of his aunt's daughters. Faris, with his best friend and confidante, Nisa (Aiza Khan) go on this journey to find the right girl for him. From the fashion ramps of Karachi to the towns of Punjab, this trip proves to be more than a memorable journey for Nisa, Faris and his 3 cousins. In the end, Faris is able to realise his feelings for Nisa and proposes to her at her wedding day with Zero. Nisa accepts the proposal and they get married. The serial ends with a dance performance by the whole cast on the title track.

Cast 
 Danish Taimoor as Faris
 Ayeza Khan as Nisa
 Bushra Ansari as Faris's mother
 Nimra Khan as Rumi
 Hira Mani as Heer
 Fizza Zehra as Nazuk
 Tipu Shareef as Raanjha
 Seemi Pasha as Rumi's mother
 Shehryar Zaidi as Rumi's father
 Hashim Butt as Heer's father
 Humaira Ali as Heer's mother
 Birjees Farooqui as Amma Ji
 Furqan Qureshi as Zero
 Rameez Siddqui as Loosey
 Aqdas Ghaffar as Rida

Soundtrack 

The original soundtrack of Jab We Wed is composed and sung by Sahir Ali Bagga. Jab We Wed OST is a true happy Pakistani song directed by Wajahat Rauf and Mohsin Ali. You will see all the stars of the drama dancing in the song including Danish, Ayza, Bushra Ansari and others. The dance in the song is choreographed by Zarmina and Brekhn.

References

External links 
 
 

Urdu-language television shows
Pakistani drama television series
Urdu 1
Urdu 1 original programming